Andrew John Parfitt (born 24 September 1958, Bristol) is the Executive Director of Talent for ad agency Saatchi & Saatchi. He was the Controller of BBC Radio 1 in the United Kingdom, and held that role from 1998–2011, taking over from Matthew Bannister. He was also the controller of BBC Radio 1Xtra, BBC Asian Network, BBC Popular Music and BBC Switch. He was recently appointed Chair of the UK charity Youth Music.

Early life
He went to Ashton Park Comprehensive School in Bower Ashton, Bristol. He then went to the Bristol Old Vic Theatre School (now an associate college of UWE). From 1978–79, he was the assistant stage manager at the Bristol Arts Centre. He later attended the Wharton School of the University of Pennsylvania.

Early career
Parfitt joined the BBC in 1980 working as a Studio Manager. He spent some time with BFBS in the Falkland Islands, before returning to the UK in 1984. He became a producer in BBC Education in 1985, then joined Radio 4 in 1987 and produced Pick of the Week and Bookshelf. He helped set up Radio 5, and became the network's Assistant Editor in 1989. He joined Radio 1 as Chief Assistant to the Controller in 1993. A year later he was promoted first to Editor, Commissioning and Planning and soon after to Managing Editor. In 1997, he became the network's Deputy Controller when Matthew Bannister was appointed Director of BBC Radio.

BBC Management
In March 1998, Parfitt was appointed Controller of Radio 1. During his time as Controller he refocussed the station on a core target audience of 16-24 year old listeners. In 2002, he oversaw the launch of BBC Radio 1Xtra, a digital radio service for fans of new black music.

Subsequently, Parfitt was instrumental in changes to the Radio 1 daytime output including the appointment of Chris Moyles as the Radio 1 Breakfast Show host in January 2004, as well as the 2006 reshuffle which saw Colin Murray move to 10pm. This saw a sustained improvement in RAJAR ratings with the station reaching the ten million mark in listenership. Although much of this was down to Moyles (who often referred to Parfitt as 'Parf Daddy'), many other shows, particularly Scott Mills, saw increases.

In July 2006 Parfitt was appointed the BBC's Teen Tzar. This made him head of all teenage entertainment - with a view of making sure the BBC offers a wider choice to the 11–25 age group.

In July 2007 Parfitt presented a two part series for BBC Radio 4 entitled California Dreaming.

In December 2007 Bob Shennan, the Controller of Five Live moved to Channel 4 to manage its new three radio stations, leaving Parfitt temporarily in charge of Five Live and Five Live Extra and the Asian Network.

In December 2008 it was announced that Parfitt's role within the BBC was to be expanded and he was taking on the role of Controller of BBC Popular Music in addition to his existing portfolio that included Radio 1, 1Xtra, Asian Network and BBC Switch. As part of his responsibilities, the Radio 1 controller would also oversee the pan-BBC music event The Electric Proms. Parfitt had been caretaking the role since Lesley Douglas resigned from the post.

In March 2009, he climbed Mount Kilimanjaro along with Radio 1 presenters Chris Moyles, Fearne Cotton and seven other celebrities for Comic Relief 2009.

On 21 July 2011 it was announced Parfitt would leave Radio 1 at the end of July, after 13 years at the station. He was succeeded as Acting Controller by Ben Cooper.

He is a Fellow of The Radio Academy.

Censorship
In December 2007, Parfitt was criticised for only authorising a cut version of The Pogues "Fairytale of New York", censoring the words 'slut' and 'faggot'. This decision was later reversed after widespread media coverage, and a decision by sister station Radio 2 to play the track uncensored.

Personal life
He married Laura Druce in 1996 in Bath and North East Somerset. They have two daughters (born July 1998 and April 2001). They have since divorced, but are still close friends.

References

External links
 BBC Press Office
 Developing BBC's Creative Futures
 Guardian October 2005 article
 Independent May 2005 article

Alumni of Bristol Old Vic Theatre School
BBC Radio 1 controllers
British radio producers
1958 births
Living people
People from Crouch End
Mass media people from Bristol
Wharton School of the University of Pennsylvania alumni